Bister may refer to:

Bister, Switzerland, a village in the canton of Valais
Bistre, a pigment and color
Bicester, Oxfordshire, United Kingdom
Bister, "abrupt", "stringent" or "austere" in Swedish
Bister, "bed" in the Urdu language
Bister, a Belgian/French condiment company